The 2018 Challenger La Manche was a professional tennis tournament played on indoor hard courts. It was the 25th edition of the tournament which was part of the 2018 ATP Challenger Tour. It took place in Cherbourg, France between 12 and 18 February 2018.

Singles main-draw entrants

Seeds

 1 Rankings are as of 5 February 2018.

Other entrants
The following players received wildcards into the singles main draw:
  Geoffrey Blancaneaux
  Corentin Denolly
  Antoine Hoang
  Constant Lestienne

The following player received entry into the singles main draw as an alternate:
  Malek Jaziri

The following players received entry from the qualifying draw:
  Rémi Boutillier
  Jay Clarke
  Alexei Popyrin
  Mikael Ymer

The following player received entry as a lucky loser:
  Maxime Tabatruong

Champions

Singles

 Maximilian Marterer def.  Constant Lestienne 6–4, 7–5.

Doubles

 Romain Arneodo /  Tristan-Samuel Weissborn def.  Antonio Šančić /  Ken Skupski 6–3, 1–6, [10–4].

External links
Official Website

2018 ATP Challenger Tour
2018
2018 in French tennis
February 2018 sports events in France